Geer Cemetery is an African-American cemetery located on Colonial Street between McGill Place and Camden Avenue in northeast Durham, North Carolina. It has also been known as City Cemetery, Old City Cemetery, East Durham Cemetery, and Mason Cemetery. It was the first cemetery for African Americans in Durham, and from 1876, when it opened, to 1924 it was the only one. In 1939 it was closed as overcrowded by the health department, although there was a burial in 1944. The city of Durham lists ownership of the cemetery as "Unknown".

In 2004 the cemetery was "heavily overgrown and...nearly invisible"; it was impossible to walk through it. The city, in collaboration with Friends of Geer, a volunteer group, and Keep Durham Beautiful Inc., has cleared the site of trees, litter, and debris, suppressed vine and weed growth, restored tilted and fallen headstones, and smoothed a gravel road through the cemetery. A stone sign was erected on Camden Street. In 2015, the 150th anniversary of North Carolina's ratification of the Thirteenth Amendment, the Friends of Geer Cemetery held an event at the cemetery.

Since at least 2020, the Friends of Geer Cemetery have partnered with faculty at Duke University, particularly Professor Adam Rosenblatt, to research the history of the cemetery and the people buried there.

Notable burials
 Edian Markham, founder of St. Joseph's African Methodist Episcopal Church
 Margaret Ruffin Faucette, founder of Durham's White Rock Baptist Church
 Augustus Shepard, father of James E. Shepard, founder of North Carolina Central University

References

External links
 Friends of Geer Cemetery
 List of known burials in Geer Cemetery
 Another list of burials in Geer Cemetery (not identical with preceding)

African-American history in Durham, North Carolina
Cemeteries in North Carolina
History of Durham, North Carolina
Tourist attractions in Durham, North Carolina